= State inspection programs =

In United States agriculture policy, state inspection programs are the state-run meat and poultry inspection programs to which USDA contributes 50% of the cost. State programs (fewer than half the states have them) must be certified by USDA to be at least equal to federal inspection requirements. However, products from state-inspected plants (most of them are smaller operations) cannot be sold outside of the state. Small plants and many state officials have endorsed bills in Congress that would permit state-inspected products to be sold into interstate and foreign commerce, but large meat and poultry companies (which must comply with federal inspection regulations) generally oppose such a change.
